TBW may refer to:

Science and medicine
 Terabytes written, the number of terabytes that can be written to a solid-state drive within its warranty service
 Total body water, concept in physiology

Transport
 TBW, the IATA code of Tambov Donskoye Airport, Russia
 TBW, the National Rail station code of Tunbridge Wells railway station, Kent, England

Organisations
 Tampa Bay Water, American drinking water company

Other
 Boeing Truss-Braced Wing, a proposed airplane design with high aspect ratio wings
 "That Bloody Woman", derogatory nickname for Margaret Thatcher
 The Bridge World, American magazine about contract bridge
That Bloody Woman, a 2015 New Zealand musical about Kate Sheppard and New Zealand women's suffrage
That Bloody Woman, the title of a 2008 biography of welfare campaigner Emily Hobhouse